SYB is a three-letter acronym which can refer to

A three letter code for Stalybridge railway station
The Statesman's Yearbook
Sydney Youth Band, a Salvation Army Brass Band for those aged 13–30.